The Columbus Clippers minor league baseball franchise has employed 17 different managers since its 1977 inception in Columbus, Ohio.

Managers
Johnny Lipon (1977-1978)
Gene Michael (1979)
Joe Altobelli (1980)
Frank Verdi (1981-1982)
Johnny Oates (1983)
Stump Merrill (1984-1985, 1990, 1993-1994, 1996-1998, 2002)
Doug Holmquist (1985)
Barry Foote (1986)
Bucky Dent (1987-1989, 2003-2005)
Rick Down (1989-1990, 1991-1992)
Bill Evers (1995)
Trey Hillman (1999-2001)
Brian Butterfield (2002)
Frank Howard (2002)
Dave Miley (2006)
John Stearns (2007)
Tim Foli (2008)
Torey Lovullo (2009)
Mike Sarbaugh (2010-2012)
Chris Tremie (2013-2018)
Tony Mansolino (2019-present)

References
General

Specific

Managers